Port Jervis station is a commuter rail stop on the Metro-North Railroad's Port Jervis Line, located in Port Jervis, New York. It is the western terminus of the Port Jervis Line.

Located slightly off US 6 and 209 in downtown Port Jervis, it is the westernmost station in the Metro-North system. It is two blocks from the bridge over the Delaware River to Matamoras, Pennsylvania,  which produces some regular commuters. The northwestern tip of New Jersey, also not far away, draws riders as well.

Station layout
The station consists of a short concrete platform, a shelter, ticket machines, and a posted schedule. Renovations to the station were completed and a ribbon cutting was held on October 4, 2021; a high level platform was built and opened on August 10, 2021.

There is ample parking. The vicinity of the station contains a yard just beyond (the tracks continue upriver, but only carry freight beyond here) and various features of the once extensive facilities that existed here when it was a division point on the Erie Railroad, including a still-working turntable, used when excursion trains operate from the station. There is also an EMD E8A locomotive, No. 833, stored at Port Jervis, painted in original Erie paint. 

The station has two tracks and a high-level side platform with a pathway connecting the platform to the bypass tracks.

Erie Depot

A short distance down the tracks from the station is the Erie Depot, which served as the city's passenger station for much of the 20th century. Built by the Erie Railroad in 1892, when passenger service continued on to Binghamton, it remained in service through the mid-1970s. In 1982 it was redeveloped, and today, it houses medical offices and some small shops.

References

External links 

 Station from Google Maps Street View

Metro-North Railroad stations in New York (state)
Railway stations in Orange County, New York
Port Jervis, New York
U.S. Route 6
NJ Transit Rail Operations stations